Karla Reuter (born 14 June 1984) is an Australian retired soccer player, who played for Queensland Sting and for Brisbane Roar in the Australian W-League.

Honours

With Brisbane Roar:
 W-League Premiership: 2008–09
 W-League Championship: 2008–09

With Australia
 AFC Women's Asian Cup Winners: 2010

References

External links
 Football Australia Profile

1984 births
Living people
Australian women's soccer players
Brisbane Roar FC (A-League Women) players
A-League Women players
Olympic soccer players of Australia
Footballers at the 2004 Summer Olympics
2003 FIFA Women's World Cup players
Australia women's international soccer players
Soccer players from Brisbane
Women's association football defenders